Gianluca Naso was the defending champion, but he lost to Alexander Flock in the first round.
Jesse Huta Galung defeated his compatriot Thiemo de Bakker in the final (6–2, 6–3).

Seeds

  Adrian Mannarino (second round)
  Tomas Tenconi (first round)
  Xavier Malisse (semifinals)
  Yuri Schukin (first round)
  Kristian Pless (first round)
  Jesse Huta Galung (champion)
  Éric Prodon (first round)
  Juan Pablo Brzezicki (quarterfinals)

Draw

Final four

Top half

Bottom half

External links
 Main Draw
 Qualifying Draw

Citta di Caltanissetta - Singles
Città di Caltanissetta